El Prado can refer to:

Places:
 El Prado Museum, in Madrid, Spain
 El Prado, California, a former town in the United States
 El Prado, New Mexico, an unincorporated suburb of Taos, Taos County, New Mexico, USA
 El Prado District,  one of thirteen districts of the province San Miguel in Peru
 El Prado, Veraguas, Panama
 El Prado Complex, a section of Balboa Park in San Diego, California 

Other:
 El Prado (horse), Irish Thoroughbred racehorse and Champion sire in the United States

See also
Prado (disambiguation)